Horizontal fissure may refer to:

 Horizontal fissure of cerebellum
 Horizontal fissure of right lung

See also
 Fissure (anatomy)
 Sulcus (morphology)